Ludlow, Vermont, may refer to:
Ludlow (town), Vermont
Ludlow (village), Vermont